The Bulgarian National Radio Symphony Orchestra (Bulgarian: Симфоничен оркестър на Българското национално радио) is a Bulgarian radio orchestra based in Sofia, Bulgaria, affiliated with Bulgarian National Radio.  It gives concerts in the Bulgaria Concert Hall.

History

Founded in 1948, the orchestra's first chief conductor was Vassil Stefanov, who remained affiliated with the orchestra from 1948 to 1988. Other conductors affiliated with the orchestra have included Vladimir Simeonov, Alexander Vladigerov, Vassil Kazandjiev, and Milen Nachev. The orchestra's current chief conductor is Emil Tabakov, since 2008. He is scheduled to conclude his chief conductorship of the orchestra in December 2015. In December 2015, the orchestra announced the appointment of Rossen Gergov as its next chief conductor, effective in January 2016.

The orchestra offers a full annual schedule of events, tours internationally and maintains a large discography of recordings. Notable people in building the orchestra over the years include Vassil Stefanov, Vladimir Simeonov, Michail Angelov, Vassil Kazandjiev, Alexander Vladigerov, Milen Nachev and Rossen Milanov.

Chief conductors
 Vassil Stefanov (1948–1988) 
 Alexander Vladigerov (1969–1991) 
 Vassil Kazandjiev (1979–1993) 
 Milen Nachev (1994–2003) 
 Rossen Milanov (2003–2008)
 Emil Tabakov (2008–2015)
 Rossen Gergov (2015–2016)
 Mark Kadin (2016-present)

References

External links
 Official Bulgarian-language homepage of the Bulgarian National Radio Symphony Orchestra

Musical groups established in 1948
Bulgarian orchestras
Radio and television orchestras
Organizations based in Sofia
1948 establishments in Bulgaria